The Calvert Formation is a geologic formation in Maryland, Virginia, and Delaware. It preserves fossils dating back to the early to middle Miocene epoch of the Neogene period. The formation is a destination for amateur fossil hunters as well as professional paleontologists. It is one of the three formations which make up the Calvert Cliffs, all of which are part of the Chesapeake Group.

Fossils 
The Calvert Formation is extremely fossiliferous. Some of the fossil species represented include the following:

Sharks 

 Otodus megalodon
 Otodus chubutensis
 Carcharodon hastalis
 Isurus oxyrhincus
 Physogaleus contortus
 Physogaleus hemmooriensis
 Galeocerdo aduncus
 Carcharhinus
 Hemipristis serra
 Squatina sp.
 Squalus sp.
 Echinorhinus blakei
 Notorhyncus cepedianus
 Hexanchus gigas
 Carcharias
 Carcharoides catticus
 Isurus retroflexus
 Parotodus benedeni
 Alopias vulpinus
 Alopias grandis
 Alopias palatasi
 Cetorhinus
 Rhincodon sp.
 Negaprion brevirostris
 Rhizoprionodon
 Sphryna laevissima
 Mustelus sp.
 Scyliorhinidae sp.

Rays and other cartilaginous fish 

 Mobula pectinata
 Mobula fragilis
 Mobula loupianensis
 Plinthicus stenodon
 Rhinoptera cf. R. studeri
 Aetobatus arcuatus
 Pteromylaeus sp.
 Dasyatis probsti
 Dasyatis rugosa
 Pristis sp.
 Edaphodon sp.
 Chimaera sp.

Bony fish 

 Acipenseridae indet.
 Bagre sp.
 Brotula sp.
 Pogonias sp.
 Sciaenops sp.
 Tautoga sp.
 Acanthocybium cf. solandri
 Thunnus sp.
 Istiophoruscf. platypterus
 Ranzania grahami
 Ranzania tenneyorum
 Ariopsis stauroforus
 Trisopterus sculptus
 Micromesistius cognatus
 Prionotus
 Lophius sp.
 Paralbula dorisiae
 Morone
 Lophokatilus ereboorensis
 Rachycentron sp.
 Pomatomus sp.
 Lagodon sp.
 Micropogonias sp.
 Sphyraena sp.
 Sarda sp.
 Makaira cf. nigricans
 Chilomycterus sp.

Cetaceans 

 Aglaocetus sp.
 Squalodon calvertensis
 Eurhinodelphis sp.
 Parietobalaena palmeri
 Eobalaenoptera harrisoni
 Cephalotrophis coronatus
 Araeodelphis
 Cetotherium
 Zarhachis flagellator
 Pelocetus
 Xiphiacetus

Pinnipeds 

 Callophoca obscura

Crocodilians 

 Thecachampsa antiquus
 Thecachampsa sericodon

Invertebrates 

 Chesapecten nefrens
 Chesapecten coccymelus
 Isognomon sp.
 Ecphora
 Architectonica trilineata

Terrestrial mammals 

 Cynarctus marylandica
 Tomarctus brevirostris
 Gomphotherium calvertensis
 Hipparion cf. phosphorum
 Amphicyon cf. frendens
 Amphicyon intermedius
 Aphelops sp.
 Archaeohippus cf. blackbergi

Birds 

 Mergus miscellus
 Morus loxostylus
 Miocepphus

See also 

 List of fossiliferous stratigraphic units in Virginia
 Paleontology in Virginia
 Paleontology in Maryland
 Calvert Cliffs State Park
 List of fossiliferous stratigraphic units in Maryland
 Chesapeake Group

References 

Neogene Maryland
Neogene geology of Virginia
Neogene Delaware